Full Scale Assault is the fourth studio album by Dutch punk hardcore band Vitamin X. Released through Tankcrimes on October 10, 2008 in the US, and Agipunk in Europe. The album was recorded at Electrical Audio in Chicago by Steve Albini who previously recorded Nirvana, Neurosis, PJ Harvey, High on Fire, Iggy Pop & The Stooges. It features guest vocals from Negative Approach's singer John Brannon. Art is by John Dyer Baizley.

An official video of the song 'Deal With It' was released featuring guest vocalist John Brannon. Thrasher (magazine) released a skate video 'Hot Feet In the Heat' featuring skater of the year Tony Trujillo using the song 'Time Has Come'

Track listing
All songs written and composed by Marc Emmerik, except where noted.

Personnel
The following people contributed to 'Full Scale Assault':

Vitamin X
Marko Korac - Vocals
Marc Emmerik - Guitars, backing vocals
Alex Koutsman - Bass, backing vocals
Wolfi - Drums

Guest musicians 
John Brannon - Vocals on 'Deal With It', 'Pressure Release' & backing vocs on 'Watcha Gonna Do' 
Nick Baran, Joe ANS - backing vocals

Other credits
Steve Albini - Recording, engineering, mixing
Alan Douches - Mastering
Benjamin Flint - Assistant engineer
Chris Koltay - Recording John Brannon vocals @ High Bias, Detroit
Patrick Delabie - Additional dubs
John Dyer Baizley - Art

References

2008 albums
Vitamin X albums
Albums produced by Steve Albini
Albums with cover art by John Dyer Baizley